Daniel Magone  (January 12, 1827 – September 4, 1904) was an American lawyer who was Collector of the Port of New York during the first administration of United States President Grover Cleveland.

Early life
Magone was born in Oswegatchie, New York into an Irish Catholic family.

Career
Magone became a member of the New York Canal Commission during the governorship of Samuel Tilden, in 1875. The next year he served as chairman of the Democratic Party (United States) state committee. During Tilden's unsuccessful run for the presidency versus Rutherford B. Hayes in 1876, he was a delegate at the Democratic National Convention.

In January 1878, he was nominated by Governor Lucius Robinson to be Superintendent of Public Works but was rejected by the New York State Senate. He was again selected a delegate to the convention which nominated Cleveland in 1884. Cleveland appointed Magone Collector of the Port of New York in 1886.

Personal life
Magone died at his Caroline Street home in Ogdensburg, New York, in 1904. He had been in declining health for some time. He was survived by his wife and a daughter.

References

External links

1827 births
1904 deaths
People from Ogdensburg, New York
New York (state) Democrats
Collectors of the Port of New York
American people of Irish descent
Lawyers from New York City